Brunswik is a surname. Notable people with the surname include:

 Egon Brunswik (1903-1955), Hungarian-American psychologist
 Else Frenkel-Brunswik (1908-1958), Polish-Austrian psychologist

Brunswik may also refer to:
 Brunswik, district of Kiel, Germany

See also
 Brunswick (disambiguation)